Jak básníci neztrácejí naději is a 2004 Czech comedy film directed by Dušan Klein and written by Klein with Ladislav Pecháček. The fifth installment in the "Poets hexalogy", the title is preceded by How the World Is Losing Poets (1982), How Poets Are Losing Their Illusions (1985), How Poets Are Enjoying Their Lives (1988), and Konec básníků v Čechách (1993), and followed by Jak básníci čekají na zázrak (2016). The film stars Pavel Kříž, David Matásek, Michaela Badinková, and Tereza Brodská. The story focuses on Štěpán, now in his forties, and the tribulations he undergoes with work and love.

Synopsis
After the death of his mother, Štěpán, now in his forties, tries to decide what to do with his life. He gets a new job as a doctor with an ambulance service, but his relationship with Ute, with whom he fell in love in the previous film, is slowly collapsing. His best friend, Kendy, asks to move in after his wife kicks him out. The two men take this reversal of fortunes with good humour, and at first, bachelorhood even has a certain appeal. Štěpán is offered the post of director at a hospital, and there he meets Anička and falls in love all over again. Anička doesn't think Štěpán is over Ute, however, and she leaves. He finds her seven months later, pregnant with his child.

Cast and characters
 Pavel Kříž as Štěpán Šafránek
 David Matásek as Kendy
 Michaela Badinková as Anička Posedlá
 Tereza Brodská as Ute
 Lukáš Vaculík as Karas
 Miroslav Táborský as Hanousek
 Josef Somr as Prof. Ječmen
 Jana Hlaváčová as Tonička
 Adriana Karembeu as Madame Krásná (as Adriana Sklenaříková)
 Pavel Zedníček as Písařík
 Oldřich Navrátil as Nádeníček
 Hoa Nguyen Khac as Mr. Ceng
 Leoš Mareš as rebel
 Tomáš Töpfer as Dr. Sahulák
 Markéta Hrubešová as Ivetka
 Eva Jeníčková as Vendulka
 Lenka Kořínková as Sylvie (as Lenka Holas Kořínková)
 Jitka Kocurová as waitress Kamila
 Otmar Brancuzský as gynecologist Vyhnálek
 Vlastimil Zavřel as Vorel
 Václav Knop as Dr. Voříšek

References

External links
 

2004 films
2004 comedy films
Czech comedy films
Czech sequel films
2000s Czech-language films
2000s Czech films